Hurmerinta is a surname. Notable people with the surname include:

Janna Hurmerinta (born 1981), Finnish singer, daughter of Maarit Hurmerinta, known by the mononym Janna
Maarit Hurmerinta (born 1953), Finnish singer, known by the mononym Maarit
Usko Kemppi (1907–1994), Finnish composer, lyricist, author and screenwriter. Called Hurmerinta until 1943